The 2008 FIFA U-20 Women's World Cup was the 4th edition of the tournament. It was held in Chile between 19 November and 7 December 2008. Sixteen teams, comprising representatives from all six confederations, took part in the final competition, in which Chile had a guaranteed place as the host nation.

Background

On 15 September 2006, FIFA officially announced Chile as the host country. It was the third time Chile organized a football world cup, after the 1962 FIFA World Cup and the 1987 FIFA World Youth Championship, but the first in the women's competition. The decision came as a surprise to Chile, as it had bid in August 2006 to host the 2008 FIFA U-17 Women's World Cup, which was finally granted to New Zealand (Ecuador was unsuccessful in both bids). Chile previously hosted the South American Under-20 Women's Football Championship and the first edition for Under 17s in January 2008.

Venues

Four different cities were selected as venues in an open bidding process. Changes to the stadiums to comply with FIFA standards were carried out between December 2007 and September 2008. The selected venues were:

Francisco Sánchez Rumoroso World Cup Stadium, Coquimbo (opening)
La Florida Bicentennial Municipal Stadium, La Florida (Greater Santiago area)
Nelson Oyarzún Arenas Chillán Municipal Stadium, Chillán
Germán Becker B. Municipal Stadium, Temuco

Qualified teams
The places were allocated as follows to confederations: AFC (3), CAF (2), CONCACAF (3), CONMEBOL (2), OFC (1), UEFA (4), plus the host country.

1.Teams that made their debut.

Squads

Group stage

The opening phase of the tournament comprised four groups of four teams, with the top two sides in each section advancing to the quarter-finals. The final draw to determine the groups took place in Santiago, Chile on 13 September 2008 at 20:30 UTC.

All times local (UTC-3)

Group A

Group B

Group C

Group D

Knockout stage
All times local (UTC-3)

Knockout map

Quarterfinals

Semifinals

3rd-place playoff

Final

Awards

The following awards were given for the tournament:

All star team
The following players were named as the All Star Team for the tournament:

Goalscorers
5 goals
  Sydney Leroux

4 goals

  Eugenie Le Sommer
  Ri Ye-gyong
  Alex Morgan

3 goals

  Marie Pollman
  Ebere Orji
  Rosie White
  Ra Un-sim

2 goals

  Daiane
  Érika
  Francielle
  Pamela
  Monica Lam-Feist
  Toni Duggan
  Nora Coton-Pélagie
  Marie-Laure Delie
  Julie Machart
  Marine Pervier
  Nicole Banecki
  Isabel Kerschowski
  Kim Kulig
  Lisa Schwab
  Asano Nagasato
  Isabell Herlovsen
  Ria Percival
  Cha Hu-nam
  Ri Un-hyang

1 goal

  Florencia Jaimes
  Adriane
  Janaína
  Ketlen
  Julie Armstrong
  Jonelle Filigno
  Loredana Riverso
  María Mardones
  Daniela Pardo
  Daniela Zamora
  Liu Shukun
  Zhang Rui
  Oliva Amani
  Brooke Chaplen
  Natasha Dowie
  Sylvie Banecki
  Katharina Baunach
  Nathalie Bock
  Bianca Schmidt
  Julia Simic
  Konomi Ataeyama
  Michi Goto
  Kie Koyama
  Asuna Tanaka
  Rumi Utsugi
  Charlyn Corral
  Dinora Garza
  Rita Chikwelu
  Ogonna Chukwudi
  Joy Jegede
  Sarah Michael
  Ida Elise Enget
  Marita Skammelsrud Lund
  Renee Leota
  Sarah McLaughlin
  Choe Un-ju
  Pak Kuk-hui
  Ra Un-sim
  Ri Hyon-suk
  Ryom Su-ok
  Becky Edwards
  Keelin Winters

Own goals

  Javiera Guajardo (1 for Nigeria)
  Nanu Mafuala (1 for Japan)
  Carolin Schiewe (1 for Brazil)
  Bianca Schmidt (1 for USA)
  Wendoline Ortiz (1 for Brazil)

References

External links
FIFA U-20 Women's World Cup Chile 2008, FIFA.com
FIFA Technical Report

FIFA
FIFA U-20 Women's World Cup tournaments
International association football competitions hosted by Chile
Women
Women's football in Chile
November 2008 sports events in South America
December 2008 sports events in South America
2008 in youth association football